The Isuzu Bellel is a compact car produced by the Japanese automobile manufacturer Isuzu from 1961 to 1966. It was the company's first independent design, and also Japan's first passenger car with a diesel engine. It was available as a four-door sedan and a five-door station wagon, called the Bellel Express. The Bellel Express was technically speaking a commercial vehicle, as was the custom in Japan at the time. The name "Bellel" resulted from combining the English word "bell" with the Roman numeral "L", equalling 50, and thus the name was supposed to represent "fifty Bells" (Isuzu literally means "fifty bells" in Japanese), and reflects a tradition within Isuzu of naming products that use terms that have special significance in Japan. Production began in time for the 1964 Summer Olympics held in Tokyo in October 1964, with initial release in select Japanese cities starting in April 1962.

The Bellel was fitted with 1.5 L and 2.0 L gasoline OHV engines with a Bosch licensed fuel injection system, and also the aforementioned  2.0 L diesel (DL201) engine. The original diesel engine was called the DL200; it offered . All engines were mated with a four-speed manual transmission with the shifter mounted on the steering column. The suspension setup was modeled after the Hillman Minx, which was previously manufactured by Isuzu under a license agreement with the Rootes Group. The list of standard equipment expanded so that it could compete for sales against more popular products from more prolific Japanese  manufacturers, helping to justify the yearly road tax bill for using a large displacement engine, while remaining compliant with Japanese Government dimension regulations. As the private car ownership market in Japan began to grow, the Bellel was offered as an alternative to the Toyota Crown, Nissan Cedric, and the Prince Gloria.

The original end treatment was updated in October 1965 in an attempt to afford the Bellel a more formal, upscale and mainstream look. The facelift included changes to the front fascia, where the previous single round headlights paired with smaller turn signals were replaced by quad round headlights arranged vertically.

The diesel engine - a first for a Japanese passenger car - made the Bellel popular for commercial applications, such as taxicab services. This partially helped to offset the Bellel's relative unpopularity with private customers, which resulted from the harshness of the early diesel engine and peculiar styling. A small number of these cars found their way into other countries, with the Bellel also offered with left-hand drive. 37,206 Bellels were manufactured in total (including the Express wagon/van), with production coming to an end in May 1967. Isuzu had a long history of manufacturing diesel engine products, and noticed in Europe that the Mercedes Benz and Peugeot intermediate class sedans also offered a diesel engine option and decided to offer one as well.

References

External links
 An essay on the Bellel in Japanese
 Images of Isuzu Bellel
 Pre-facelift Bellels for sale (notice the triangular taillights)
 1964 Bellel's role as a taxi in the 1966 movie "What's Up, Tiger Lily?"

Bellel
Rear-wheel-drive vehicles
Mid-size cars
Sedans
Station wagons
Cars introduced in 1961